Kodi Smit-McPhee (born 13 June 1996) is an Australian actor. He gained recognition as a child actor for his leading roles in The Road (2009) and Let Me In (2010). He provided the voice of the titular character in ParaNorman (2012) and appeared in Dawn of the Planet of the Apes (2014), X-Men: Apocalypse (2016), Alpha (2018), and Dark Phoenix (2019).

In 2021, Smit-McPhee garnered critical acclaim for playing a troubled teenager in Jane Campion's western film The Power of the Dog. He received various accolades for his performance, including a Golden Globe Award and a nomination for the Academy Award for Best Supporting Actor.

Early life
Smit-McPhee was born on 13 June 1996 in Adelaide, South Australia, the son of Sonja Smit and Andy McPhee. His father is an actor and former professional wrestler. His older sister is actress and singer Sianoa Smit-McPhee.

At age 16, Smit-McPhee was diagnosed with ankylosing spondylitis, a degenerative form of arthritis which causes vertebrae in the spine to fuse and can lead to chronic pain and loss of vision. Due to the condition, he is blind in his left eye.

Career 

Smit-McPhee's first feature film role was in Romulus, My Father, which garnered him the 2007 AFI Award for Best Young Actor as well as a Best Actor nomination. For his appearance in The Road (2009), he received a Critics' Choice Award nomination for Best Young Actor and a 2010 Australian Film Institute (AFI) nomination for Best International Actor. The following year, he starred in Let Me In, for which he received a 2010 Critics Choice Award nomination for Best Young Actor for his performance in the film. 

Smit-McPhee then voiced the lead role of Norman in ParaNorman, a 2012 animated comedy horror film which was nominated for Best Animated Feature for the 2013 Academy Awards, and also received a 2013 BAFTA Award nomination for Best Animated Film. Later the same year, Smit-McPhee had a role in Dead Europe, which premiered at the 2012 Toronto International Film Festival. His next role came in The Wilderness of James in the title role of James. He also starred in A Birder's Guide to Everything, which premiered at the 2013 Tribeca Film Festival, and played Benvolio in a film adaptation of Romeo and Juliet. He co-starred in the 20th Century Fox film Dawn of the Planet of the Apes (2014).

In 2013, Smit-McPhee filmed the action science fiction film Young Ones. The film premiered at the Sundance Film Festival in January 2014. Soon afterwards he appeared in Slow West, which was released in 2015.

In March 2014, he was cast in the Nine Network's seven-part drama series Gallipoli which was broadcast in February and March 2015, the year that marks the 100th anniversary of the Gallipoli landing. He plays 17-year-old Thomas "Tolly" Johnson, who pretends to be older so that he can enlist with his brother Bevan and ends up fighting at Gallipoli in the campaign that helped create the Anzac legend. Aged 17 when he undertook the role, Smit-McPhee said afterwards that it showed "that soldiers aren't the patriotic brave souls they look like, it's showing them at their most vulnerable in tragic times and when they are terrified".

Smit-McPhee played Nightcrawler in X-Men: Apocalypse (2016), a character whose older version was previously played by Alan Cumming. Smit-McPhee reprised the role in Dark Phoenix, which was released in 2019.

In 2018, he played the central character Keda, an Ice Age adolescent who tames a wolf, in Alpha.

In 2021, Smit-McPhee starred in Jane Campion's film The Power of the Dog. The film premiered at the 78th Venice International Film Festival, where it opened to critical acclaim. Smit-McPhee's performance in particular received praise, with Carlos Aguilar of TheWrap calling him "terrifyingly remarkable" and Peter Bradshaw of The Guardian writing, "Smit-McPhee brings something inscrutably complex and reserved to his character's behaviour". In March 2022, Smit-McPhee joined  Alfonso Cuaron's upcoming Apple+ series Disclaimer.

Filmography

Film

Television

Awards and nominations 

Smit-McPhee received many youth awards for his performances in films Romulus, My Father (2007), The Road (2009) and Let Me In (2010). 

His critically acclaimed performance in The Power of the Dog (2021) earned him a Golden Globe Award for Best Supporting Actor, as well as nominations in that category at the Academy Awards, BAFTA, Critics' Choice and SAG Awards.

References

External links 
 
 

1996 births
21st-century Australian male actors
Living people
Male actors from Adelaide
Male actors from Melbourne
Actors with disabilities
Australian male child actors
Australian male film actors
Australian male television actors
Australian male voice actors
Best Supporting Actor Golden Globe (film) winners
People with ankylosing spondylitis